This article contains a list of the 911 saints
canonized
by Pope Francis (2013–) during his pontificate, which includes the 813 Martyrs of Otranto as a group, 7 whom were equipollently canonized and 4 whom were canonized in other countries.

See also
List of canonizations
List of saints canonized by Pope Leo XIII
List of saints canonized by Pope Pius XI
List of saints canonized by Pope Pius XII
List of saints canonized by Pope John XXIII
List of saints canonized by Pope Paul VI
List of saints canonized by Pope John Paul II
List of saints canonized by Pope Benedict XVI

References

Saints canonized by Pope Francis
Saints canonized by Pope Francis
21st-century Christian saints
 
Francis